Aspidoglossa brachydera is a species of ground beetle in the subfamily Scaritinae. It was described by Henry Walter Bates in 1878.

References

Scaritinae
Beetles described in 1878